Cilento is an Italian geographical region of Campania in the central and southern part of the Province of Salerno and an important tourist area of southern Italy.

Cilento is known as one of the centers of Mediterranean diet.

Geography
The coast of Cilento is located on the Tyrrhenian Sea, stretching from Paestum to the Gulf of Policastro, near the town of Sapri. Most of the touristic destinations in the coast are frazioni (hamlets) of comuni whose seats are inland; examples include Santa Maria di Castellabate, Acciaroli, Velia, Palinuro, Marina di Camerota, Scario and Policastro Bussentino.

The inner boundaries are the Alburni mountains and Vallo di Diano, sometimes considered as part of Cilentan geographical region, which has in Sala Consilina its largest center. The most important towns in this area are Vallo della Lucania (in the middle), Sapri and Agropoli: this is the largest town of Cilento and the principal harbour. Most of this area is included in "Cilento and Vallo di Diano National Park".

Inland communes

Alfano
Campora
Celle di Bulgheria
Felitto
Futani
Laurino
Moio Della Civitella 
Montano Antilia 
Monte Cicerale
Monteforte Cilento
Morigerati
Ogliastro Cilento
Omignano
Ottati
Piaggine
Salento
Sessa cilento
Prignano Cilento
Rutino
Sacco
Stio
Torchiara
Tortorella
Trentinara
Vallo della Lucania

Seaside Communes
Agropoli
Ascea 
Camerota 
Capaccio
Caprioli
Casal Velino 
Castellabate 
Centola
Montecorice 
Palinuro
Pisciotta
Pollica 
San Giovanni a Piro 
San Mauro Cilento
Sapri

History

Greek colonies
The region is steeped in Greek mythology and legends, as in the names of some towns, which is also visible in the remains of the colonies of Velia (ancient Elea) and Paestum (ancient Poseidonia). Velia was also the seat of "Eleatics", a school of pre-Socratic philosophers as Parmenides, Zeno of Elea and Melissus of Samos).

Cilento comes by the Latin word Cis Alentum, meaning "On this side of the Alento".

Sixth province of Campania
In the 1990s it was proposed to make Cilento a new province of Campania. This proposal has never come near to implementation; in particular there was the difficulty of choosing an administrative centre. The four candidates were Vallo della Lucania (in the most central position), Agropoli (the largest town, situated in the north), Sala Consilina (the most populous town of Vallo di Diano) and Sapri (in the centre of southern Cilento, with the most important railway station). Another more recent proposal was to move Cilento from Campania to Basilicata, as a third province together with the existing provinces of Potenza and Matera.

The Cultural Pyramid

In 2020, the poet Menotti Lerro drew an innovative Cultural Pyramid of Cilento. The form of this came out adding the "Cultural Triangle" he founded (Omignano - "The Aphorisms Village", Salento - "The Poetry Village" and Vallo della Lucania "Seat of the Contemporary Center of the Arts") at the historical summits of high cultural tradition in Cilento: Paestum, Velia and Palinuro. In a second moment also Trentinara - "The Village of Love" joined. Within the Triangle a new literary, artistic, philosophical and cultural movement arose: the Empathism (Empathic School).

National Park

In 1991, Cilento and Vallo di Diano National Park was instituted to preserve the landscape and promote tourism. In 1998, the park became a World Heritage Site of UNESCO.

Coast

The Cilentan Coast, or Costiera Cilentana in Italian, is a stretch of coastline situated in the gulfs of Salerno and Policastro, extending in 16 municipalities; from Capaccio-Paestum in the north-west to Sapri in the south-east.

Language

Cilento was part of ancient Lucania, and its language is influenced by Lucanian. In the north of Cilento the dialect is more influenced by Neapolitan, but in the south it has many similarities with Sicilian.

Cilento DOC
Italian wine, red, white and rose, under the Cilento DOC appellation comes from this area. Grapes destined for DOC product must be harvested to a maximum yield of 12 tonnes/hectare with the finished red wines fermented to a minimum alcohol level of 11.5% and the whites and roses fermented to 11%.

Red Cilento wines are a blend of 60-70% Aglianico, 15-20% of Piedirosso and/or Primitivo, 10-20% Barbera and up to 10% of other local red grape varieties. The whites are a blend of 60-65% Fiano, 20-30% Trebbiano, 10-15% of Greco and/or Malvasia bianca with up to 10% of other local white varieties. The roses are blends of 70-80% Sangiovese, 10-15% of Piedirosso and/or Primitivo and up to 10% of other local red grape varieties. A separate varietal Aglianico can also be produced under the Cilento DOC provided that at least 85% of the wine is Aglianico with Primitivo and/or Piedirosso permitted to fill in the remainder and that the wine is aged at least one year before it is released.

Photogallery

See also

Cilento and Vallo di Diano National Park
Vallo di Diano
Velia ("Elea")
Paestum ("Poseidonia")
Pruno Cilento
Cilentan language
Gulf of Salerno
Agropoli
Vallo della Lucania
Sapri
Sala Consilina
Marina di Camerota
Certosa di Padula (Padula)
Cape Palinuro (Palinuro)

References

Sources
 Maurizio Tortora: Cilientu mia. Edizione del Delfino, 1977, Naples
 Giuseppe Vallone: Dizionarietto etimologico del basso Cilento. Editore UPC, 2004
 Pietro Rossi: Ieri e oggi 1955-2005. Poesie in cilentano. Grafiche Erredue, 2005
 Barbara Schäfer: Limoncello mit Meerblick. Unterwegs an der Amalfiküste und im Cilento. Picus, 2007, 
 Peter Amann: Cilento aktiv mit Costa di Maratea - Aktivurlaub im ursprünglichen Süditalien. Mankau, 2007, 
 Peter Amann: Golf von Neapel, Kampanien, Cilento. Reise Know-How, 2006, 
 Barbara Poggi: La Cucina Cilentana - Köstlichkeiten aus der Cilento-Küche. Mankau, 2006, 
 Luciano Pignataro: Le ricette del Cilento. Ed. Ippogrifo, 2007, 
 Menotti Lerro, La Scuola Empatica: movimento letterario-artistico-filosofico e culturale sorto in Italia nel 2020, Ladolfi, 2020

External links

What to do and see in Cilento and Tourism in Cilento 
Cilento and Vallo di Diano National Park 
Historical and other infos about Cilento and Vallo di Diano National Park 
Cilento Photos 
Tourism in the National park of Cilento 
Tourism and holidays in Cilento 
Cilento Social Network 

 
Geography of Campania
Tourist attractions in Campania
Biosphere reserves of Italy
World Heritage Sites in Italy
Geographical, historical and cultural regions of Italy